The Women's time trial of the 2019 UCI Road World Championships was a cycling event that took place on 24 September 2019 in Harrogate, England. It was the 26th edition of the event, for which Dutch rider Annemiek van Vleuten was the defending champion, having won in 2018. 53 riders from 33 nations entered the competition.

Dygert Owen finished over a minute and a half ahead of the previous year's runner-up Anna van der Breggen, who finished second for the third year in a row. Defending champion Annemiek van Vleuten finished third at a further twenty seconds slower than van der Breggen.

Qualification
All National Federations were allowed to enter four riders for the race, with a maximum of two riders to start. In addition to this number, the outgoing World Champion and the current continental champions were also able to take part.

Participating nations
53 cyclists from 33 nations took part in the women's time trial. The number of cyclists per nation is shown in parentheses.

Final classification

References

External links

Women's time trial
UCI Road World Championships – Women's time trial
2019 in women's road cycling
UCI